McPherson County is a county in the U.S. state of Nebraska. As of the 2020 United States Census, the population was 399, making it the least populous county in the state of Nebraska and the fifth-least populous county in the United States. Its county seat is Tryon. The county was formed in 1890 from Logan County; it was named for Civil War General James B. McPherson.

In 1913 a portion of McPherson County was partitioned off to create Arthur County, giving McPherson County its present boundaries.

McPherson County is part of the North Platte, NE Micropolitan Statistical Area.

In the Nebraska license plate system, McPherson County is represented by the prefix 90 (it ranked 90th of 93 counties in the number of vehicles registered when the license plate system was established in 1922).

Geography
The terrain of McPherson County consists of low rolling hills sloping to the south-southeast. A small portion of the area is under center pivot irrigation.

Most of Nebraska's 93 counties (the eastern 2/3, including McPherson County) observe Central Time; the western counties observe Mountain Time. McPherson County is the westernmost of the Nebraska counties to observe Central Time.

Adjacent counties

 Hooker County - north
 Thomas County - northeast
 Logan County - east
 Lincoln County - southeast
 Keith County - southwest (boundary of Mountain Time)
 Arthur County - west (boundary of Mountain Time)

Major highways
  Nebraska Highway 92
  Nebraska Highway 97

Demographics

As of the 2000 United States Census, there were 533 people, 202 households, and 157 families in the county. The population density was 0.6 people per square mile (0.2/km2). There were 283 housing units at an average density of 0.3 per square mile (0.1/km2). The racial makeup of the county was 97.94% White, 0.38% Asian, 1.69% from other races. 1.50% of the population were Hispanic or Latino of any race. 44.4% were of German, 14.4% American, 9.2% Irish, 8.7% Swedish and 6.3% English ancestry according to Census 2000.

There were 202 households, out of which 34.20% had children under the age of 18 living with them, 73.80% were married couples living together, 3.50% had a female householder with no husband present, and 21.80% were non-families. 19.80% of all households were made up of individuals, and 14.40% had someone living alone who was 65 years of age or older. The average household size was 2.64 and the average family size was 3.01.

The county population contained 27.60% under the age of 18, 5.30% from 18 to 24, 26.10% from 25 to 44, 22.90% from 45 to 64, and 18.20% who were 65 years of age or older. The median age was 41 years. For every 100 females, there were 99.60 males. For every 100 females age 18 and over, there were 97.90 males.
The median income for a household in the county was $25,750, and the median income for a family was $31,250. Males had a median income of $25,192 versus $13,393 for females. The per capita income for the county was $13,055.  16.20% of the population and 14.00% of families were below the poverty line.  Out of the total people living in poverty, 21.70% are under the age of 18 and 17.30% are 65 or older.

Communities

Census-designated place 
 Tryon (county seat)

Unincorporated community 
 Ringgold

Former communities
 Flats

Politics
McPherson County voters have been strongly Republican since the beginning. In only two national elections since 1900 has the county selected the Democratic Party candidate (as of 2020). In 2016, Democrat Hillary Clinton had the worst showing for a major party Presidential candidate in the county's history, tallying just 14 votes for only 4.9%. She had accumulated less votes than any third-party or write-in votes, making it the only county in Nebraska for this to happen.

References

 
Nebraska counties
North Platte Micropolitan Statistical Area
1890 establishments in Nebraska
Populated places established in 1890